The 2016–17 Ranji Trophy was the 83rd season of the Ranji Trophy, the first-class cricket tournament in India. It was contested by 28 teams divided into three groups. Groups A and B comprised nine teams, and Group C comprised ten teams. Mumbai finished top of Group A, qualifying for the knockout stage of the tournament, along with Gujarat and Tamil Nadu.

Points table

Fixtures

Round 1

Round 2

Round 3

Round 4

Round 5

Round 6

Round 7

Round 8

Round 9

See also
 2016–17 Ranji Trophy
 2016–17 Ranji Trophy Group B
 2016–17 Ranji Trophy Group C

References

External links
 Series home at ESPN Cricinfo

Ranji Trophy seasons
Ranji Trophy Trophy
Ranji Trophy
Ranji Trophy